Do It for Free is the second album by Atlanta-based band The Constellations.

Track listing
 "Black Cat" 
 "Afterparty" 
 "Right Where I Belong"
 "All My Great Escapes" 
 "Back in Atlanta" 
 "Let It Go"
 "Do It for Free"
 "The Ol' Speakeasy"
 "The Breeze"
 "April"
 "Side By Side"
 "Let's Get Paid
 "Hallelujah"

References

2012 albums